Anton Krammer (14 March 1929 – 20 October 1986) was an Austrian footballer. He competed in the men's tournament at the 1952 Summer Olympics.

References

External links
 

1929 births
1986 deaths
Austrian footballers
Austria international footballers
Olympic footballers of Austria
Footballers at the 1952 Summer Olympics
Association football defenders